S3G may refer to:
 S3G reactor : A naval reactor used by the US Navy.
 Sanguino3 G-Code: A file-format used by some additive fabrication machines such as the Makerbot CNC cupcake.
 S3G, a diode electrical component